Dabugaon Girls High School is a girls' residential school in Nawrangpur, the poorest of Odisha's 30 districts in India. It is the only residential girls' high school in Nawrangpur, which has five Kanyashrams.

A month's stipend for the school, which has 170 resident students at Rs 325 per person, is Rs 55,000. The individual stipend covers food, two school uniforms, underwear and toiletry. A separate amount is paid for textbooks and writing materials but these are paid five to six months after a new session has begun. This creates a shortage of books, which hinders teaching. A student who fails to be promoted to the next class loses the school the entitlement to the individual stipend. Most girls fail in Science and Mathematics because of a shortage of teachers in those subjects. There is, however, a Cash Reward Scheme under which Rs 100,000 was disbursed by the government in 2002 to teachers, for improving their students' performance in scheduled area high schools and residential schools, to which the school belongs.

Sources
Boloji - Travails of Tribal Girls by Manipadma Jena from 2003-04-12 Retrieved 2007-08-29

Boarding schools in Odisha
Girls' schools in Odisha
High schools and secondary schools in Odisha
Nabarangpur district
Educational institutions in India with year of establishment missing